The following is a list of notable people from Watertown, New York.

 Eric Anzalone, singer, actor, author, member of the Village People
 Samuel Beardsley, New York State Attorney General (1836–1839) and U.S. congressman
 Antonio Blakeney (born 1996), current professional basketball player for Hapoel Be'er Sheva of the Israeli Basketball Premier League
 Albert Bouchard, drummer for and co-founding member of rock band Blue Öyster Cult
 Joe Bouchard, bassist for and co-founding member Blue Öyster Cult; brother of Albert Bouchard
 John Calhoun, founding publisher of the Chicago Democrat
 Rocco Canale, NFL player for Philadelphia Eagles (1944–1949)
 Emma Kerr-Carpenter, member of the Montana House of Representatives
 Reginald Case, artist
 Allen Welsh Dulles, director of the Central Intelligence Agency
 John Foster Dulles, U.S. Secretary of State
 Frederick Exley, author of A Fan's Notes, 1968, and other works
 Leonard J. Farwell, businessman and Wisconsin governor
 Moses W. Field, U.S. congressman, one of the founders of the Independent Greenback Party
 Paul Finkelman, Chancellor of Gratz College, author, historian
 Roswell P. Flower, U.S. congressman and governor of New York (1892–1895)
 John Gary, singer
 Oscar S. Gifford, lawyer and South Dakota politician
 Eric Greif, lawyer and heavy metal music figure
 Richard Grieco, actor, model, singer, former college football player
 Robert Guinan, painter
 Vic Hanson, athlete, enshrined in the Basketball Hall of Fame (1960) and the College Football Hall of Fame (1973)
 Fred Harvey Harrington, educator and president of the University of Wisconsin–Madison, born in Watertown.
 Serranus Clinton Hastings, U.S. congressman and founder of the Hastings College of the Law at the University of California
 Charles B. Hoard, businessman and member of the United States House of Representatives
 Mary-Margaret Humes, actress
 Orville Hungerford, U.S. congressman, banker, and railroad president
 Robert Lansing, U.S. Secretary of State
 Donald Lutz, baseball player for Cincinnati Reds
 Dick May, NASCAR Sprint Cup driver
 Tim McCreadie, NASCAR Xfinity and ARCA series driver, and multiple national Late Model Dirt Series Champion.
 John M. McHugh, US Secretary of the Army
 Viggo Mortensen, actor and author, star of The Lord of the Rings film trilogy, A History of Violence, and The Road
 Mark Neveldine, actor, writer, producer, director (Crank, Crank: High Voltage, Gamer, Ghost Rider: Spirit of Vengeance & The Vatican Tapes)
 Denis O'Brien, New York State Attorney General (1883–1887)
 Natalie Oliveros, wine expert, vineyard owner, model and adult actress known as Savanna Samson, raised in Watertown.
 Charles Pierce, female impersonator, particularly noted for his impersonation of Bette Davis.
 Kyle Puccia, Billboard-charting singer/songwriter
 Matt Puccia, NASCAR Sprint Cup series crew chief
 Maggie Rizer, supermodel and AIDS activist
 Gary M. Rose, former United States Army officer, Vietnam War veteran, and recipient of the Medal of Honor
 Virgil Ross, animator, born in Watertown
 Elwyn E. Royce, Wisconsin State Assemblyman
 Charles H. Sawyer, governor of New Hampshire
 Mary Gay Scanlon, congresswomen from PA 5
 Arthur Shawcross, serial killer
 Electa Nobles Lincoln Walton (1824–1908), educator, lecturer, writer, and suffragist
 Frank Winfield Woolworth, founder of F. W. Woolworth Company/Five and Dime stores, worked at a store in Watertown at his start
 Charles W. Yost, U.S. Ambassador to the United Nations
 Zina D. H. Young, leader in the Church of Jesus Christ of Latter-day Saints and social activist

References

Watertown, New York